Ahlten is a village in northern Germany with a population of around 5500. It belongs to the administrative district of the city of Lehrte, five kilometres east. Both towns are part of the multitown region "Hanover Region" with its own administration.

Ahlten is 10 km east of the City of Hannover which is the capital town of the federal state "Niedersachsen" (Lower Saxony).

Ahlten is since the 1920s the site of a large substation. From this substation in 1944 an experimental HVDC power line to Misburg was built (Lehrte-Misburg HVDC).

External links 
 Official website

Villages in Lower Saxony